The 1983–84 Honduran Liga Nacional season was the 18th edition of the Honduran Liga Nacional.  The format of the tournament consisted of a four round-robin schedule.  C.D.S. Vida won the title and qualified to the 1984 CONCACAF Champions' Cup along with runners-up Universidad.

1983–84 teams

 Dandy (San Pedro Sula)
 Juventud Morazánica (Tegucigalpa)
 Marathón (San Pedro Sula)
 Motagua (Tegucigalpa)
 Olimpia (Tegucigalpa)
 Platense (Puerto Cortés, promoted)
 Real España (San Pedro Sula)
 Universidad (Tegucigalpa)
 Victoria (La Ceiba)
 Vida (La Ceiba)

Regular season

Standings

 No post-season this year.

Top scorer
  Raúl Centeno Gamboa (Platense) with 17 goals

Squads

Known results

Round 1

Unknown rounds

References

Liga Nacional de Fútbol Profesional de Honduras seasons
1
Honduras